Jo Hea-Jung (born March 5, 1953) is a South Korean volleyball player, who was a member of the South Korea Women's National Team that won the bronze medal at the 1976 Summer Olympics.

Clubs
  Midopa (1973~1977)
  Lions Baby Ancona (1979~1981)

Awards
 1973 FIVB World Cup - "Most Valuable Player"

References

1953 births
Living people
South Korean women's volleyball players
Volleyball players at the 1972 Summer Olympics
Volleyball players at the 1976 Summer Olympics
Olympic bronze medalists for South Korea
Olympic volleyball players of South Korea
Olympic medalists in volleyball
Asian Games medalists in volleyball
Volleyball players at the 1970 Asian Games
Volleyball players at the 1974 Asian Games
Medalists at the 1970 Asian Games
Medalists at the 1974 Asian Games
Asian Games silver medalists for South Korea
Medalists at the 1976 Summer Olympics